XEQ-TDT (channel 22, virtual channel 9) is a Televisa TV station, based in Mexico City. XEQ is the flagship television station of the Nu9ve network. The Nu9ve network, unlike the other major networks in Mexico, is broadcast by a mix of full-time repeaters as well as local stations, operated by Televisa and its local partners, that also produce and air local programs.

History
XEQ was founded in 1968, as XHTM-TV channel 8 operated by Televisión Independiente de México (TIM). TIM was headquartered at Estudios San Angel from the time it signed on. In January 1973, TIM merged with Telesistema Mexicano, becoming Televisión Vía Satélite, better known as Televisa. TIM's Mexico City headquarters and production center became Televisa San Angel, which along with Televisa's original Chapultepec facility, is one of the network's two primary Mexico City studios.

In 1985, Imevisión desired to add a VHF station in Mexico City, which became XHIMT-TV channel 7. In order to accomplish this, a complex channel swap was conducted involving XHTM and Televisa's relay stations at Altzomoni in the State of Mexico. XEX-TV, then on channel 7, was moved to 8, and XEQ-TV, then on 9, was moved to channel 10. As part of the move, Televisa moved the XEQ-TV callsign to Mexico City, so the two repeaters on Puebla became XEX-TV and XHTM-TV.

For much of the 1980s, Televisa devoted channel 9 to noncommercial cultural and educational programming. This ended in 1992 with XEQ-TV returning to commercial programming.

In 2018, the concessions of all Televisa-owned Nu9ve stations were consolidated in the concessionaire Teleimagen del Noroeste, S.A. de C.V., as part of a corporate reorganization of Televisa's concessionaires.

Digital channels
The station's digital signal is multiplexed:

Analog-to-digital conversion
XEQ-TV and other television stations in Mexico City and Toluca discontinued regular programming on its analog signal, over VHF channel 9 (8 in Toluca), on December 17, 2015 at 12:00 a.m., as part of the IFT federally mandated transition from analog to digital television.

In 2016, in order to facilitate the repacking of TV services out of the 600 MHz band (channels 38-51), XEQ was allowed to move from channel 44 to channel 22. The change occurred in April 2017, including a brief period in which both facilities operated at the same time. The Toluca transmitter repacked in July 2018 at the same time as the other Televisa stations in Toluca.

Repeaters

|-

|}

The Toluca station carries certain local programs and is known as Nu9ve Estado de México. Local programming in Toluca began in 2002.

External links 
 Official web page
 Gala TV Estado de México

References

Spanish-language television stations in Mexico
Nueve (Mexican TV network) affiliates
Television stations in Mexico City
Television stations in the State of Mexico
Television channels and stations established in 1968